Canon Raymond Lemaire (1878–1954) was a professor at the Catholic University of Leuven, both student and successor of Joris Helleputte.

Life
Lemaire was ordained to the priesthood in 1901 and graduated with a doctorate in Archaeology and Art History in 1906. From 1907 onwards he taught at the Catholic University, at various times giving courses on ecclesiastical architecture, conservation, applied aesthetics and architectural history. He was particularly interested in Romanesque architecture in Belgium. He played an important role in debates about the reconstruction of Leuven after the extensive destruction wrought upon the city during the First World War.

Works

As an architect, Lemaire designed the Redemptorist church, Leuven and the Institute of Agriculture, Heverlee.

Publications
 Les origines du style gothique en Brabant: L'architecture romane (Brussels, Vromant, 1906)
 La reconstruction de Louvain: rapport présenté au nom de la Commission des alignements (Louvain, Wouters-Ickx, 1915)
 Jezus goddelijk werkmanskind: retraite voor volksjongens: kenteekens der bouwwijze van de streek (Brussels, Vromant, 1918)
 De toestand der godsdienstige kunst : toespraak (...) bij gelegenheid van de prijsuitdeeling in de Sint-Lucasschool, Gent, 1921 (1921)
 Het Laatste Avondmaal van Dierik Bouts: voordracht gehouden in de Sint-Pieterskerk op 7 november 1921 (Leuven, Van Linthout, 1921)
 Les études actuelles d'architecture et nos monuments anciens (Brussels, Heyvaert, 1931)
 Beknopte geschiedenis van de meubelkunst (Antwerp, De Sikkel, 1937; fourth edition 1947)
 L'architecture du Moyen Age au pays de Namur (Namur, Dubois, 1943)

References

Further reading
  Quincy Goris, Monumentenzorg in de praktijk: restauraties van de Sint-Lambertuskapel te Heverlee door Kanunnik Lemaire en Raymond M. Lemaire voltooid in respectievelijk 1937 en 1965 (Dissertation, KU Leuven, 2002).

1878 births
1954 deaths
Academic staff of the Catholic University of Leuven (1834–1968)